Tag Wars is a periodic professional wrestling tag team tournament held by the U.S. based promotion Ring of Honor.

Tournaments have taken place in 2010, 2014, 2016 and 2019.

List of winners

Tag Wars Tournament

Tournament results

2010
ROH's first Tag Wars Tournament took place from July 16, 2010 to August 28, 2010. The Finals of the tournament was a four-way Ultimate Endurance match for the ROH World Tag Team Championship.

2014
ROH's second Tag Wars Tournament took place on November 22, 2014 in Baltimore, Maryland. The Finals of the tournament was a Four Corner Survival Elimination match for the ROH World Tag Team Championship.

2016
ROH's third Tag Wars Tournament took place on June 11 and 12, 2016 in Hopkins, Minnesota, with the finals taking place in Milwaukee, Wisconsin.

2019
ROH's forth Tag Wars Tournament took place on Jan 24 and 25, 2019 in Dallas, Texas and Houston, Texas, with the semifinals and the finals taking place on Jan 26, 2019 in San Antonio, Texas.

The winners would receive an ROH World Tag Team Championship match, and qualify for the 2019 Crockett Cup.

References

External links

Recurring events established in 2006
Ring of Honor shows
Ring of Honor tournaments
Tag team tournaments